= Kodak Zi8 =

2009 video camera

The Kodak Zi8 is a video camera released by Kodak in 2009. It features 1080p video recording, 5-megapixel still image capture, SDHC card support, and electronic image stabilization.

It became popular with many videographers because of the availability of a stereo (two channel) external microphone port.

The Zi8 has received mostly positive reviews. CNET gave it an 8.2 out of 10, TechRadar gave it a 4 out of 5, and PC Magazine gave it a 4 out of 5.
